The TeST TST-5 Variant is a Czech homebuilt aircraft that was designed and produced by TeST Gliders of Brno, introduced c. 1998. When it was available the aircraft was supplied as a completely assembled aircraft, without engine or instruments, and also as a kit for amateur construction.

Design and development
The TST-5 Variant features a strut-braced shoulder-wing, a two-seats-in-side-by-side configuration enclosed cockpit under a bubble canopy, fixed tricycle landing gear with wheel pants and a single engine in tractor configuration.

The aircraft is of all-wood construction. Its constant-chord wing with a NACA 4415 airfoil is intended to give docile handling and is supported by "V"-struts. The standard engine used is the M-125 powerplant.

The manufacturer estimated the construction time from the supplied "express-built" kit as 250 hours.

Variants
TST-5 Variant
Original model with constant chord, strut-braced wing
TST-5 Variant Duo
Model with tapered cantilever wing

Specifications (TST-5 Variant)

References

External links

TST-5
1990s Czech and Czechoslovakian sport aircraft
1990s Czech and Czechoslovakian civil utility aircraft
Single-engined tractor aircraft
Shoulder-wing aircraft
Homebuilt aircraft
Aircraft first flown in 1998